Caesar the Conqueror (Italian: Giulio Cesare, il conquistatore delle Gallie) is a 1962 Italian film directed by Tanio Boccia. The scenario is based on Julius Caesar's Commentarii de Bello Gallico.

The plot centres around Julius Caesar's battling the rebels in Gaul.

Cast 
Cameron Mitchell as Julius Caesar
Rik Battaglia as Vercingetorix
Dominique Wilms as Queen Astrid
Ivica Pajer as Claudius Valerian
Raffaella Carrà as Publia
Carlo Tamberlani as Pompey
Cesare Fantoni as Caius Opio
Giulio Donnini as Eporedorix
Nerio Bernardi as Cicero
Carla Calò as Calpurnia
Piero Palermini
Bruno Tocci as Mark Anthony
Aldo Pini as Quintus Cicero
Lucia Randi as Clelia
Fedele Gentile as Centurion
Enzo Petracca as Titus Azius
Alberto Manetti

Biography

References

External links 
 Caesar the Conqueror (1962) at DBCult Film Institute

1962 films
1960s historical drama films
1960s biographical drama films
Italian biographical drama films
Peplum films
1960s Italian-language films
Films directed by Tanio Boccia
Gallic Wars films
Films set in ancient Rome
Films about Julius Caesar
Depictions of Mark Antony on film
Cultural depictions of Vercingetorix
Cultural depictions of Cicero
Cultural depictions of Calpurnia (wife of Caesar)
Biographical films about military leaders
Italian historical drama films
Sword and sandal films
Historical epic films
1962 drama films
1960s Italian films